Eric Brimley Litchfield (21 September 1920 – 23 July 1982) was a British footballer for Newcastle United and Leeds United, sports editor of The Rand Daily Mail between 1956 and 1970, sports editor of the Cape Times between 1970 and 1982 and an author of books on South African cricket, rugby and association football.

Early life
Litchfield was born in West Derby, Lancashire on 21 September 1920 and educated at Bedford Modern School. He left school at the age of 16 to join Bedford Town F.C. but was also a strong cricketer who had been offered a place at Northamptonshire.

Football and World War II
Litchfield joined Newcastle United in January 1939 but, just as he was starting to establish himself, the war broke out and he was restricted to just two games, one in each of the 1939–40 and 1942–43 seasons. He joined the Royal Air Force but still managed to make guest appearances as a footballer during the war years (for Millwall, Reading, York and Northampton) and was a sports journalist on several service newspapers.

Litchfield made his debut for Leeds United against York in the first game of the 1941–42 Football League Northern Section (First Championship) and in that season he scored his first goal for Leeds against Bradford.

Journalism
After the war, Litchfield emigrated to South Africa where he became a journalist and author, initially in Durban with the Natal Mercury before moving to The Rand Daily Mail in 1949. He became sports editor of The Rand Daily Mail in 1956 and was later sports editor of the Cape Times between 1970 and 1982.

Authorship
Litchfield wrote The Springbok Story From The Inside in 1960, followed by two books devoted to football: Goals In The Sun in 1963 and Book of Soccer in 1965. His writing later turned to cricket with Cricket Grand Slam about South Africa's test series against Australia in 1970 and, with D.J. (Jackie) McGlew, Six for Glory in 1967.

Litchfield was made a Life Member of the National Football League for his contribution to the establishment of professional football in South Africa.

Personal life
Litchfield married Gillian Mai Johnston in 1948 and they had one son. He later married Lynn with whom he had a daughter, Wendy. He was working as the new editor of the Protea Cricket Annual of South Africa when he died in Cape Town on 23 July 1982.

Selected bibliography
 The Springbok Story From The Inside. Published by Timmins; Bailey & Swinfen, 1960
 Goals In The Sun. Published by Simondium-Uitgewers, Johannesburg, 1963
 Book Of Soccer. Published by H. Kearthland, Johannesburg, 1965
 The Story of the Wilfred Isaacs XI. Published in Johannesburg, 1966
 Book Of The Tests. Published by The Rand Daily Mail, Johannesburg, 1967
 Six For Glory. Jackie McGlew and Eric Litchfield. Published by Timmins, Cape Town, 1967
 Cricket Grand-Slam. Published by Bailey Brothers & Swinfen, Folkestone, 1970
 Cape Town City F.C.. Published by Howard Timmins, Cape Town, 1972
 Protea Cricket Annual Of South Africa - 1982. Published by Protea Assurance, Cape Town, 1982

References

1920 births
1982 deaths
British sports journalists
South African sports journalists
Leeds United F.C. players
Newcastle United F.C. players
People educated at Bedford Modern School
Association footballers not categorized by position
English footballers
Royal Air Force personnel of World War II
British emigrants to South Africa